The coat of arms of Birmingham – the heraldic emblem of the English city of Birmingham – was first used in 1838 and has changed several times since, as the former town grew and developed into a city.

History

Incorporation
 
Following the incorporation of Birmingham as a borough in 1838, the corporation approved the design of a seal comprising "The Birmingham Arms, encircled with a wreath", with the motto "Forward". The arms were those used from about 1413 to 1536 by the de Bermingham family, holders of the manor.

The quartered shield featured in the first and fourth quarters five gold lozenges or diamond shapes conjoined in a diagonal bend. These were the original arms of the de Berminghams until about 1343. The second and third quarters were divided vertically with an indented line. This should have been coloured in sable and argent (black and white), but in the version adopted by the corporation it was coloured or and gules (gold and red). These were in fact the arms of another branch of the family, who became the Barons of Athenry and Earls of Louth in Ireland. In 1867 a new seal was made, and at the time the discrepancy in the colouring of the second and third quarters was noticed. However, it was decided to retain the colouring.

City status
In 1889 Birmingham was granted city status, and to celebrate this fact, the corporation applied to the College of Arms for a grant of supporters to the arms. It was then realised that the arms used by Birmingham had never been officially granted, so a full grant of arms, crest and supporters was obtained in April of that year.

The shield was altered, with the addition of an ermine fess or horizontal band across the centre. This comes from the arms of the Calthorpe family, lords of the manor of Edgbaston, an area included in the borough at its incorporation. A mural crown – resembling a city wall – was placed on the fess to represent local government. The crest consisted of a man's arm holding a hammer, symbolising industry. The supporters were two human figures: a male figure (dressed as a blacksmith) representing industry and a female figure (holding a book and painter's palette) representing art.

Modernisation
By 1930 the city corporation felt that the design looked too old fashioned and adopted a new depiction designed by the Birmingham School of Art.

As there were doubts about the heraldic correctness of the new design, a new painting was obtained from the College of Arms in 1936 incorporating the changes, but still conforming to the 1889 blazon or technical description. The main changes were the addition of a helm and mantling between the shield and crest, a redrawing of the male figure and the replacement of the platform on which the supporters stood with a grassy compartment.

These arms continued in use until the abolition of the corporation.

Current
A new City of Birmingham was created, including the old city and the former borough of Sutton Coldfield, in 1974. New arms were granted to Birmingham City Council in 1977, closely based on the old arms. The ermine fess was changed to a cross, charged with a bishop's mitre. These come from the Sutton Coldfield corporation arms and commemorate Bishop Vesey of Exeter, a native of Sutton, who was largely responsible for the growth of the town in the 16th century. A Tudor rose was added to the 1889 crest. This was the device of Sutton Coldfield from at least 1619 until 1935. As the College of Arms does not allow two bodies or persons to have identical supporters, they were swapped to opposite sides of the shield. The male figure now holds a cupel, a tool used in the manufacture of jewellery, an important industry in modern Birmingham.

Use 
As well as its use on seals and letters, the coat of arms is used in a number of ways, for example as an architectural detail, or to decorate items including buses (in the days when municipal transport was the responsibility of the council), street furniture, refuse collection vehicles, and even the crockery and cutlery used in the Council House. The coat of arms are on street signs across the city. They are situated on the left side of the street sign, with the postcode area on the right side.

The council flag is a banner of the arms and flies daily from public buildings within the city, including the Council House and the Town Hall in Victoria Square.

See also
Flag of Birmingham

References

External links

Official coat of arms web page
Birmingham Coat of Arms gallery on Flickr
Birmingham flag

Birmingham
History of Birmingham, West Midlands
1838 establishments in England
Birmingham City Council
Birmingham
Birmingham
Birmingham
Birmingham
Birmingham
Birmingham